The Col. Joseph Young Block was located just to the north of downtown Davenport, Iowa, United States. It was listed on the National Register of Historic Places in 1983. The building has subsequently been torn down. It occupied the same block as the Wupperman Block/I.O.O.F. Hall, which was next door, the Old City Hall, and the Clarissa C. Cook Library/Blue Ribbon News Building. The library and this building were removed from the National Register in 2014.

History

The building was constructed by Colonel Joseph Young, a land speculator, in  1857. He probably built this building on speculation. It housed retail and service businesses over the years, which included different saloons and restaurants. The building had been declining over the years and it was slated for demolition when a part of the building collapsed on August 9, 2009. The building was torn down later that year.

Architecture
The Colonel Young Block was a three-story, nine bay, brick building that was built on a stone foundation. Its decorative elements were found in the tall narrow windows and their projecting hoods. When it was built it featured an ornate cornice that was removed in later years. A skim coat application had been applied to the exterior. The building's original three-bay storefronts were altered with a permastone covering.

References

Commercial buildings completed in 1857
Renaissance Revival architecture in Iowa
Former buildings and structures in Davenport, Iowa
Former National Register of Historic Places in Iowa
Commercial buildings on the National Register of Historic Places in Iowa
National Register of Historic Places in Davenport, Iowa
Demolished buildings and structures in Iowa
1857 establishments in Iowa